The Last Light of the Sun is a 2004 fantasy novel by Canadian writer Guy Gavriel Kay. Like many of his books, it is set in a world that draws heavily upon real times, events, places and people. In this particular book, the period is the Viking invasions of Saxon England. The story concerns a young Erling's attempt to prove himself as a warrior, his father's attempts to make amends for his mistakes, a young prince searching for revenge and a King's attempt to transform his realm into a more civilized one that will resist attacks from the Erlings forever. 
The books main themes are revenge, violence, the passing of an era, clash of cultures, and love, especially between father and son.

Connections to other works by Kay
The novel is set in the same world as Kay's The Lions of Al-Rassan and The Sarantine Mosaic, taking place at an indeterminate time. A passing reference to the mosaic Crispin created at the end of The Sarantine Mosaic and to the works of Rustem implies that decades or perhaps centuries have passed. A conversation about Leontes' time on the throne puts  The Last Light of the Sun roughly three hundred years afterwards.  Asharite merchants from Al-Rassan, and references to the Khalifate of Al-Rassan in the description of Firaz ibn Bakir, put this book chronologically either before or during the events of The Lions of Al-Rassan.

Analogies to real world history
Aeldred, is based clearly on Alfred the Great.
The Erling culture is analogous to that of the Vikings. The "Cyngael" and "Anglcyn" are based on the Welsh people and the Anglo-Saxons, respectively. "Rheden" appears to be an analogue of the Anglo-Saxon kingdom of Mercia. 
The main religion of Jadism, the one hated by the Erlings, is clearly based upon Christianity. This religion also appears in The Lions of Al-Rassan and The Sarantine Mosaic.

Plot
Bern Thorkellson, a young Erling man, has been a slave on Rabady Island in Vinmark since his father Thorkell killed a man in a drunken fit of rage.  He escapes from Rabady Island and travels to Jormsvik, a fortress for elite Erling mercenaries. He gains admittance to their ranks and joins a raiding party heading from Vinmark to Anglcyn.

In Cyngael, Alun ap Owyn and his brother Dai, two Princes of the province of Cadyr, arrive at the house of Brynn ap Hywll, a renowned fighter and leader of another Cyngael province. They are accompanied by the famed Jaddite cleric Ceinon. In an attack by Erling raiders, Dai is killed and his soul is taken by a fairy to the fairy queen. Alun witnesses this event and later begins a relationship with one of the faeries.

Among the Erlings who participated in the attack is Bern's father, Thorkell Einarsson, who is taken captive and becomes a retainer in Brynn's household.

Anglcyn is ruled by Aeldred, who in his youth saved the kingdom from Erling conquest. Aeldred is building a strong nation and has begun to collect manuscripts and foster scholarship.  One of the scholars he wishes to attract to his court is Ceinon, who is unwilling to give up his role as leader of the Jaddite faith among the Cyngael.

Bern's team of mercenaries attack Anglcyn but are defeated by Aeldred's professional army.  Bern and Thorkell have a brief reunion, but Bern rejoins the Erlings in a new quest to kill Brynn ap Hwyll and regain a famous sword.

Once the Erlings arrive in Cyngael, they find themselves outnumbered and their fate is decided in a contest of single combat.  Thorkell offers himself as the champion of the Cyngael and is slain in an act of sacrifice for his son. Prompted by Thorkell's final words, the Erlings depart and once again change course to loot an undefended monastery in a southern land.  They return to Jormsviking with great wealth.

After the combat Alun uses the sword of Ivarr's grandfather to kill the souls of mortals that had been taken as the faerie-queen's lovers and later discarded, including the soul of his own brother Dai.  Alun's relationship with the faerie ends.

Throughout the novel references are made towards the slow but steady growth of civilization as kingdoms are built, the wilderness is pushed back and it is revealed that even the most lawless places such as Jormsviking will eventually fall under the sway of a king.  Most of the characters welcome the changes, which bring increased order and prosperity to their lands.  The religion of Jad is strongly implied to play a civilizing role through its learned clerics and a shift towards a somewhat more restrained mentality.

Reception
January Magazine called The Last Light of the Sun Kay's "darkest and in some ways most ambitious novel to date". A review on SF Site called it "an extremely evocative tale".  A second review on SF Site by Alma H. Hromic noted:  "It's another vivid, complex fantasy from Kay's pen. There is the usual sense that there is more, so much more, in the background of this story than the reader has been told -- the sense of glimpsing a few shining threads in a larger tapestry. A book to savour."

In a review for Quill & Quire, Cori Dusmann stated that the "in-depth examination of so many characters slows the tale down" with "every question answered ... and little left to wonder about".

Awards
Kay was nominated for the Canadian Sunburst Award nomination in 2005 for The Last Light of the Sun.

References

External links
 The Last Light of the Sun at Bright Weavings

2004 Canadian novels
Novels by Guy Gavriel Kay
Novels set in Anglo-Saxon England
Novels set in the Viking Age